John Dancer was an Irish dramatist, connected with the Theatre Royal, Dublin. His works consist of several translations from Italian and French, original plays, and some miscellaneous stories and poems.

Life 
John Dancer lived for some time in Dublin, where two of his dramatic translations were performed with some success at the Theatre Royal. To the Duke of Ormonde and to the Duke's children, Thomas, Earl of Ossory, and Lady Mary Cavendish, he dedicated his books, and in 1673 he wrote that he owed to the Duke "all I have and all I am". It is probable that he was in Ormonde's service while he was Lord-Lieutenant of Ireland.

Identity 
Langbaine groundlessly credits him with the alternative name of Dauncy, and identifies him with one John Dauncy, who was a voluminous translator living at the same time. But John Dancer and John Dauncy were clearly two persons.

Works 
Dancer's two translated plays - the one from Corneille and the other from Quinault - are in rhyming couplets. The original "love verses" at the close of the translation of Tasso's Amintas are "writ in imitation of Mr. Cowley's 'Mistris'".

Dancer's works are as follows:

 Aminta, the Famous Pastoral [by Tasso], translated into English verse, with divers Ingenious Poems, London, 1660.
 Nicomede, a tragicomedy translated out of the French of Monsieur Corneille, as it was acted at the Theatre Royal, Dublin, London, 1671. This was published by Francis Kirkman 'in the author's absence', and dedicated by Kirkman to Thomas, Earl of Ossory. To the play Kirkman added a valuable appendix—A true, perfect, and exact Catalogue of all the Comedies, Tragedies, Tragicomedies, Pastorals, Masques, and Interludes that were ever yet printed and published till this present year 1671.
 Judgment on Alexander and Cæsar, and also on Seneca, Plutarch, and Petronius, from the French of Renaud Rapin, London 1672.
 The Comparison of Plato and Aristotle, with the Opinions of the Fathers on their Doctrine, and some Christian Reflections, from the French, London 1673; dedicated to James, Duke of Ormonde.
 Mercury Gallant, containing many true and pleasant relations of what hath passed at Paris from January 1st 1672 till the king's departure thence, from the French, London 1673; dedicated to George Bowerman.
 Agrippa, King of Alba, or the False Tiberinus. As it was several times acted with great applause before the Duke of Ormonde, L.L. of Ireland, at the Theatre Royal in Dublin; from the French of Monsieur Quinault, London 1675; dedicated to Ormonde's daughter Mary.

Appraisal 
According to Leslie Birkett Marshall, Dancer's original poems, appended to the translation of Aminta, are "light, competent lyrics of inconstancy, farewells, resolutions and persuasions to love". Alastair Fowler included one of them ("The Variety") in his Oxford poetry anthology, The New Oxford Book of Seventeenth Century English Verse, 1991.

References

Citations

Bibliography 

 Clark, William Smith (1955). The Early Irish Stage: The Beginnings to 1720. Oxford: Clarendon Press. 
 Fowler, Alastair, ed. (1991). The New Oxford Book of Seventeenth Century Verse. Oxford: Oxford University Press.
 Langbaine, Gerard (1691). "John Dancer, alias Dauncy". In An Account of the English Dramatick Poets. Oxford: Printed by L.L. for George West and Henry Clements.
  
 Lee, Sidney; Braida, Antonella (2004). "Dancer, John (fl. 1660–1675), translator and playwright". In Oxford Dictionary of National Biography. Oxford: Oxford University Press.
 Marshall, Leslie Birkett (1936). Rare Poems of the Seventeenth Century. Cambridge: Cambridge University Press.
 O'Donoghue, David James (1912). "Dancer, John". In The Poets of Ireland: A Biographical and Bibliographical Dictionary of Irish Writers of English Verse. Dublin: Hodges Figgis & Co., Ltd.

External links 

 Ockerbloom, John Mark, ed. "Dancer, John, fl. 1660-1675". The Online Books Page. Retrieved 10 April 2022.
 Stewart, Bruce (2015). "John Dancer". Ricorso: A Knowledge of Irish Literature. Retrieved 10 April 2022.

17th-century Irish writers
17th-century translators
17th-century Irish dramatists and playwrights